Alexander Andre Marshall (born 24 February 1998) is a Jamaican professional footballer who plays as a winger.

Club career

Early career
Born in Kingston, Marshall attended St. George's College.

Cavalier
Marshall made his senior debut for Cavalier in the 2014–15 season, but did not make another senior appearance until after the club was relegated from the National Premier League in the 2015–16 season. In 2015 he trained with American club Philadelphia Union. In the KSAFA Super League, Marshall scored three goals in league play and in May 2017 he scored in the KSAFA Super League final, a 2–1 win over Santos, earning Cavalier promotion back to the National Premier League.

In the 2017–18 season, Marshall made 30 league appearances, scoring seven goals. In October 2018 he was linked with a transfer to a number of English Premier League clubs, including Leicester City, Aston Villa, Tottenham Hotspur, Liverpool and West Ham United.

The following season, Marshall made 34 appearances, scoring eleven goals. In February 2019, he spent a month on trial with Greek Super League side Aris Thessaloniki. In the 2019–20 season, he made ten appearances and scored three goals before departing Cavalier mid-season.

HFX Wanderers
On 29 January 2020, Marshall signed with Canadian Premier League club HFX Wanderers. He made his Wanderers debut on 15 August against Pacific FC Marshall scored his first goal for the Wanderers during the 2021 season, scoring the opener in a 1-1 draw with Forge FC on 22 August. The Wanderers announced in January 2022 that they had re-signed Marshall to a new deal through 2023. After the conclusion of the 2022 CPL season, HFX announced they had declined Marhsall's contract option, ending his time with the club.

International career

Youth
Marshall represented Jamaica at the 2014 CFU Men's U-17 Tournament, scoring seven goals, and was named the tournament's Most Valuable Player. In the opening match of the tournament against the U.S. Virgin Islands, he scored a hat-trick in a 19–0 victory. In the second group stage match against the Cayman Islands, Marshall scored another hat-trick in a 5–3 win.

Marshall made five appearances at the 2015 CONCACAF U-17 Championship, including the playoff loss on penalties to the United States, which saw Jamaica miss out on qualification for the 2015 FIFA U-17 World Cup.

In July 2019, Marshall played for the Jamaica's U23s in Caribbean qualifying for the 2020 CONCACAF Men's Olympic Qualifying Championship and was named team captain. In the opening match against Dominica, he assisted on Nicque Daley's equalizing goal in a shock 1–1 draw. Marshall also played in the second match against Saint Kitts and Nevis and had some good scoring opportunities, but the match ultimately finished in another 1–1 draw, eliminating Jamaica from qualifying.

Senior
Marshall trained with the senior national team in May 2017, and made his senior debut later that year.

Career statistics

Club

International

Honours
Cavalier
 KSAFA Super League: 2017

Individual
 CFU Men's U-17 Tournament MVP: 2014

References

External links

1998 births
Living people
Association football wingers
Jamaican footballers
Sportspeople from Kingston, Jamaica
Jamaican expatriate footballers
Expatriate soccer players in Canada
Jamaican expatriate sportspeople in Canada
Cavalier F.C. players
HFX Wanderers FC players
National Premier League players
Canadian Premier League players
Jamaica youth international footballers
Jamaica international footballers